Off the Leash is the sixth album by Scottish-Canadian Celtic punk band The Real McKenzies.  It was recorded in 2008 and released on August 5 of that year.

Track listing
 "Chip"  
 "The Lads Who Fought & Won"  
 "The Ballad of Greyfriars Bobby"
 "Kings of Fife"  
 "Old Becomes New"  
 "White Knuckle Ride"
 "The Maple Trees Remember" 
 "Anyone Else"  
 "My Mangy Hound" 
 "Too Many Fingers"  
 "Drink Some More"  
 "Guy on Stage" 
 "Culling the Herd"

References

External links 
 realmckenzies.com

2008 albums
The Real McKenzies albums
Fat Wreck Chords albums